Angono ( or ), officially the Municipality of Angono,  is a 1st class municipality in the province of Rizal, Philippines. According to the 2020 census, it has a population of 130,494 people.

It is best known as the "Art Capital of the Philippines", being the hometown of national artist for music Lucio San Pedro and national artist for visual arts Carlos "Botong" Francisco, as well as the site of the Angono Petroglyphs, the oldest known work of art in the Philippines. It is currently campaigning for its inclusion in the UNESCO Creative Cities Network as it is a center for visual arts. It is also campaigning for the inclusion of the Angono Petroglyphs (1 of 5 properties of the Petroglyphs and Petrographs of the Philippines UNESCO tentative site) in the World Heritage List.

First created as a pueblo in 1766, Angono was a barrio of its neighboring town Taytay and Binangonan before it was legally proclaimed an independent municipality in 1938 by then President Manuel L. Quezon.

Etymology 
The Name "Angono" was derived from the myth of Panguno which Comes from the word "Ang nuno" which means "The Dwarf"

Geography 
Angono is boundaried by Taytay in the north, Antipolo in the northeast, Teresa in the east, and Binangonan in the south.

Barangays

Angono is politically subdivided into 10 barangays:
 Bagumbayan – This barangay came from the Filipino word "bagong bayan" which means "new town".
 Mahabang Parang – The word "mahaba" means "long" and "parang" is a type of "machete", so the name of this barangay roughly translates to "long machete".
 Poblacion Ibaba – The name of this barangay came from the Spanish word "población" meaning "town" and from the Filipino word "ibaba" which means "below". Therefore, this barangay means "town below".
 Poblacion Itaas – This is the least populous barangay with a population of 583 people. The name roughly translates to "town above".
 San Isidro – The largest and most populous barangay with a population of 31,339 people. This is also one of the largest and most populous barangays in the Philippines. This barangay is named after the Catholic patron saint of farmers named "Isidore the Farm Labourer" or "Isidore the Laborer".
 Santo Niño – This barangay's name was inspired by the image of Jesus Christ as a child garbed in royal clothing known as the "Sto. Niño"
 San Pedro – This barangay's name came from the apostle of Jesus Christ "Saint Peter".
 San Roque – The name of this barangay came from the patron saint of the sick and invalids known as "Saint Roch".
 San Vicente – This barangay's name came from the Dominican saint Saint Vincent Ferrer.
 Kalayaan – This barangay's name came from the Filipino word kalayaan, meaning "freedom".

Climate

Demographics

Religion

Christianity is the major religion in the town, and the majority of all Christian denomination is Catholicism and a minority of Iglesia ni Cristo, Members Church of God International Born Again, Jehovah's Witnesses and more.

Catholic Churches:
Diocesan Shrine and Parish of St. Clement, Barangay Poblacion Ibaba
St. Joseph the Worker Parish, Barangay Mahabang Parang
Christ the King Chapel, Exodusville Subdivision
San Vicente Chapel, Brgy. San Vicente.
Sto. Niño Chapel, Constellation Homes Subdivision

Economy 

There are several business establishments present in the booming town of Angono. The SM Center Angono is considered one of the major businesses in town. Trade and commerce are active, such data processing, pawnshops and banks as well. With nearly 100,000 inhabitants in this urbanized town, progress is at its peak. The proposed Angono Fish Port to be constructed at the lakeside shore of Laguna de Bay will soon boost more business opportunities and easier access from the nearby towns situated at the shores of the said lake.

Angono is known as the Arts Capital of the Philippines. With the existence of numerous business establishments and leisure hubs/historical sites, this town is surely a tourist destination.

Culture

Angono is the hometown of two national artists, Lucio San Pedro for music and Carlos "Botong" Francisco for visual arts. One of the public schools in Barangay Mahabang Parang is named Carlos "Botong" V. Francisco Memorial National High School in honor of the said artist. The town also boasts of other artists like Nemi Miranda (also known as Nemiranda), Perdigon Vocalan, Jose "Pitok" Blanco and the Blanco Family. Around the town are artworks such as various sculptures and murals.

Angono also boasts of several actors/actresses Joey Hipolito, Freddie Reynoso, Zoraida Sanchez, Mike Tan, Nikki Gil, and BJ Tolits Forbes; GMA TV Host Herlene "Hipon" Budol; news anchor Sandra Aguinaldo and film director Cathy Garcia-Molina.

The artistic town of Angono celebrates the feast of Pope Clement I every November 22 to 23 of each year. There are times that this coincides with the feast of Christ the King. The celebration starts with the novena mass on the 14th till 22nd day of November, where devotees in prayer and thanksgiving dance in the church patio after each novena mass. The dancing is often accompanied by the symphonic/marching bands of Angono while church bells ring.

The town is currently campaigning for its inclusion in the UNESCO Creative Cities Network as a center for visual arts. It is also campaigning for the inclusion of the Angono Petroglyphs (1 of 5 properties of the Petroglyphs and Petrographs of the Philippines UNESCO tentative site) in the World Heritage List.

Bisperas Mayores
The Bisperas Mayores or the day before the feast day is celebrated with a parade of marching bands, drum and lyres sponsored by each barangay of Angono held in the morning and early afternoon. The morning parade usually starts in Rainbow Village and ends at the church patio where the devotees again dance in praise and thanksgiving while the marching bands play. The afternoon parade is also joined by papier-mâché higantes, local government officials and employees, commercial establishments in Angono, schools and other Angono socio and civic groups.

The celebration on the morning of November 23 starts with a concelebrated mass with the Bishop of Antipolo. The procession follows after the mass with parehadoras, higantes and devotees joining the image of St. Isidore the Laborer, Pope Clement I and the Virgin Mary in a procession leading to the banks of Laguna de Bay in Barangay San Vicente for the fluvial procession, fishes like kanduli, tilapia and bangus which are caught by the fishermen devotees during the fluvial procession are displayed near the image of Pope Clement I. The images, devotees and members of the band ride the pagoda for the procession in the lake which will disembark at another part of the Angono shoreline side of the lake in Barangay Poblacion Ibaba. The road procession will again start with merry making of parehadoras, higantes and wet devotees which will culminate in the church. Filipino artistry is truly alive in every celebration in Angono.

Cristo Rey
The feast of Christ the King which is held on the Sunday before the 1st Sunday of Advent usually coincides with the feast of Pope Clement I. The Viva San Clemente! celebration banners usually include “Mabuhay ang Kristong Hari!” slogans to remind the people that Christ is the Lord and to proclaim Christ as the King of all nations. This is also a reminder that Pope Clement I is only a servant of God which somehow does not need adoration of the people because our Lord has already given him the highest honor – a blessing of a Saint – Angono's patron and inspiration.
Viva San Clemente

Pope Clement I was the fourth pope of the Catholic Church after Pope Peter the prince of the apostles, Pope Linus, and Pope Anacletus. He faithfully proclaimed Christ during his time and until his martyrdom by being thrown into the sea attached to an iron anchor. The people of Angono celebrate Pope Clement I's feast day with a fluvial procession in the waters of Laguna de Bay as a reminder and inspiration of his faith in God.

Higantes Festival

Angono's joyous fiesta in honor of Pope Clement I whose image, resplendent in papal vestments, is held November 22–23, and involves a procession accompanied by parehadoras devotees dressed in colorful local costumes, wooden shoes and carrying boat paddles and higantes, giant papier-mâché effigies. The street event culminates in fluvial procession at Laguna de Bay amidst revelry that continues until the image is brought back to its sanctuary.

Higantes Festival is now promoted as tourism-generating event in the country. This attracts numerous tourists from all over the world.

It was said that the higantes started during the Spanish colonial times. When Angono was once a hacienda and ruled by Spanish hacienderos The Guido. The Angono land tillers' way of protesting their struggle was by making giant effigies of their landlords whose hands are usually high up on their waist.

The body of the traditional higante is made of bamboo and colorful cloth and its faces of papier-mâché. The three oldest higantes of Angono consists of a family of giants – the father, mother and child higante, they traditionally add color and fun during the fiesta celebration. It was in the 80s when then Angono artist Perdigon Vocalan brought the idea of the Higantes Festival by going out of the traditional family of giants and advocating having more higantes in the fiesta by coordinating with the barangays of Angono to come up with Higantes that will represent their barangay. At present, the Higantes of Angono can be seen in fiesta celebrations around the Philippines and in national cultural presentations, a highlight being the Centennial Parade in the Quirino Grandstand for the Philippine Centennial celebration in 1998.

The higantes are made of papier-mâché. Higantes measures four to five feet in diameter and ten to twelve feet in height. Traditionally, it began in the last century when Angono was a Spanish hacienda. These higantes were influenced by the Mexican art form of papier-mâché brought by the Spanish priests to the Philippines.

Parehadora
The traditional parehadoras are group of young girls holding paddles and wearing bakya or wooden slippers and dressed in a colorful outfit which joins the procession in the feast day of Pope Clement I. They usually march at the beat of the band playing alongside them. Now with a dying lake, the tradition of the Parehadora is now just a reminder that Angono was once a fishing village and thrives at the harvest of Laguna Lake.

Salubong
Black Saturday is highlighted by 3-hour presentation of “Vigilia na Muling Pagkabuhay” at the patio of the church. On Easter Sunday, a celebration is held as the reunion of the Risen Christ with Virgin Mary is reenacted. It is facilitated by a young girl inside an inverted giant paper flower suspended from a bamboo trellis who removes the mourning veil from Mary's head. The petals of the suspended flower are mechanically opened by giant birds attached to strings to reveal the girl inside. It is then followed by a religious dancing of young ladies called “Kapitana” and “Tenyenta”, to the tune of “Bati”.

Government

Sangguniang Bayan 2022-2025:
Mayor: Jeri Mae Calderon (NPC)
Vice Mayor: Gerardo Calderon (NPC)
Councilors: 
Arvin Villamayor (NPC)
Patnubay Tiamson (NP)
Roberto Sison, Jr. (NPC)
Jhoana Duran (NPC)
Emmanuel Natividad (NPC)
Florinio Matusoc (NPC)
Maria Elena Ibañez (NPC)
Agustin Canlas (NPC)
ABC / LNB President: Roberto B. Miranda
SK President: Bernard Joecel “BJ Tolits” Forbes

List of local chief executives

Education

Schools:

ALC High School
Angono Christian School
Angono Elementary School
Angono National High School
Angono Private High School
Baby Jesus Chrissamore Learning Center
Blanco Family Academy
Charis Praise Christian Academy
Christ the King College of Angono
Colegio De San Clemente
Crossmount School of Arts and Trades
Eastern Light College
Faderoga's Learning Center
Gingergrace Academe
Holy Deliverance Integrated Christian School
Hope Academy
Jason Harvey Academy
Joaquin Guido Elementary School
Jonathan T.M. Caballero Academy of Special Needs 
Joyland Playschool Childcare and Learning Center
Lakeside Hills Learning School
Little Footprints Playschool and Tutorial Center
Little Lambs Learning Center
Maranatha Christian Academy
Marrieve of Light School
Mind Slot Integrated School
 Carlos "Botong" V. Francisco Memorial National High School
New Hope in Faith School
Nuestra Senora De Guia Academy - East Rizal
Praise Christian Academy
Raises Academy
Regional Lead School for the Arts in Angono
Seven Angels College
Shinil Cristian Academy
St. Catherine Learning Center
St. Martin Montessori School
Santo Entiero Learning Center
San Vicente Elementary School
Teensy Weensy Child Development Christian School

Healthcare
Angono Medics Hospital
St. Clement Medical, Inc.
Rizal Provincial Hospital (Angono Annex)
San Isidro Hospital
San Isidro Hospital (Angono Annex)
Mikko Medics Medical Maternity & Lying-in Clinic

See also
 List of Cultural Properties of the Philippines in Angono, Rizal

References

External links

[ Philippine Standard Geographic Code]
Philippine Census Information
Local Governance Performance Management System
https://web.archive.org/web/20131029195219/http://www.tourism.gov.ph/sitepages/FestivitiesList.aspx?festivityCode=205&monthCode=04

Municipalities of Rizal
Populated places on Laguna de Bay
Populated places established in 1938
1938 establishments in the Philippines